Piletocera inconspicualis is a moth of the family Crambidae. It is found in Papua New Guinea.

It has a wingspan of 30 mm.

References

I
Endemic fauna of Papua New Guinea
Moths of Papua New Guinea
Moths described in 1907
Taxa named by George Hampson